Gololcha River is a river of eastern Ethiopia.

Rivers of Ethiopia